A mistico was a large sailing coaster used in the Mediterranean in the 18th and 19th centuries. Misticos were decked vessels with long, low hulls and had two masts amidships that carried two lateen or settee sails and a jib. They ranged in size from 40 to 80 tons (bm), and had crews of five to nine men. They were popular with Greek pirates in the Aegean and resembled the felucca.

On 25 October 1806, the Spanish privateer mistico Generalísimo, of four guns and 70 men,  captured HM gunboat Hannah, of two guns and 28 men, in the Straits of Gibraltar.
In 1825–26  was the lead vessel of a small squadron engaged in anti-piracy operations in the Archipelago, at Alexandria, and around the coasts of Syria. On 27 July 1826 Cambrians boats captured a pirate bombard and burnt a mistico on the Cycladic island of Tinos.

Citations and references
Citations

References
Folkard, Henry Coleman (2012) The Sailing Boat: A Treatise on English and Foreign Boats and Yachts. (Books on Demand)
Sala, George Augustus, and Edmund Hodgson Yates (1876) Temple bar. (Ward and Lock).

Sailboat types
Ship types
18th-century ships
Tall ships